El Salvador  alias El Henrique was a Spanish treasure ship that ran aground near present-day Beaufort Inlet, North Carolina during a hurricane in August 1750. She was traveling with six other Spanish merchantmen including the Nuestra Señora De Soledad which went ashore near present-day Core Banks, NC and the Nuestra Señora de Guadalupe which went ashore near present-day Ocracoke, NC.

The merchant ship El Salvador sailed from Cartagena, Colombia for Cadiz, Spain loaded with a cargo of gold and silver where she was part of the Spanish treasure fleet, a convoy system adopted by the Spanish Empire from 1566 to 1790. After taking on supplies in Havana, Cuba the heavily laden El Salvador headed for Cadiz with six other Spanish ships on August 7, 1750. Around noon on August 25 the El Salvador and the six other vessels in the fleet were caught in a hurricane Northeast of present-day Cape Canaveral, Florida. The storm forced the ships North along the Gulf Stream where the El Salvador, Soledad and Guadalupe were driven ashore along the Outer Banks of North Carolina. Reports found in the Spanish archives indicate that El Salvador was carrying 240,000 pesos in registered Spanish Treasury funds, made up of four chests of gold coins and sixteen chests of silver coins of varying denominations, plus 50,000 pesos in commercial funds. Only four members of the crew survived the wrecking. According to a letter written to North Carolina Gov. Gabriel Johnston in September 1750, the ship was badly broken up and buried in several feet of sand with only the rigging still visible above the water.

Archival documents confirm that most of the treasure aboard the other Spanish ships was salvaged but that El Salvador’s cargo of gold and silver was never recovered. During the storm she is believed to have rolled over the bar, broken apart and was soon buried in the sand. Currently Intersal, Inc., a Florida-based company, holds an exclusive permit issued by the North Carolina Department of Natural and Cultural Resources (NCDNCR) which grants the company the right to search for El Salvador.  The permit allows the company to retain 75% of all treasure and cargo it recovers from the El Salvador site with the remaining 25% going to the State of North Carolina.

In 2015 Intersal, Inc. filed a lawsuit against the state of North Carolina, the North Carolina Department of Natural and Cultural Resources and the Friends of the Queen Anne's Revenge nonprofit for a breach of contract relating to the El Salvador permit. North Carolina appealed a lower court's ruling in Intersal's favor. But, on November 2, 2019, the North Carolina Supreme Court affirmed Intersal's complaint and voted to send the lawsuit back to the N.C. Business Court for reconsideration.

References

External links
 N.C Supreme Court revives lawsuit over Blackbeard’s ship and lost Spanish treasure ship, Fayetteville Observer
 Two firms seek ship, Carolina Coast Online
 Treasure hunter in race to uncover ship of riches, Google
 Philip Masters, True Amateur of History, Dies at 70, New York Times
 Shipwrecks and Treasure: the Spanish Treasure Fleet of 1750
Treasure hunter that found Blackbeard's pirate ship sues state for $8.2 million, Fayetteville Observer
Lawmakers enter legal battle over Blackbeard's ship, News & Observer
Photographer suing state over Blackbeard shipwreck footage, WRAL-TV
Blackbeard's Law would clarify control of media rights to shipwrecks, News & Record
Controversy Over Blackbeard's Queen Anne's Revenge Continues, Public Radio East
Battle Over Shipwreck Photos Brews in N.C., Courthouse News
Plunder disputes plague the wreck of Blackbeard’s ship, Soundings
Friends group calls it quits on fundraising, Carteret County News Times
Episode 955: Pirate Videos, Planet Money, NPR

Shipwrecks in the Atlantic Ocean
Shipwrecks
Shipwrecks of the Carolina coast
Underwater archaeological sites
18th-century ships